Viktor Yonov (born 5 September 1946) is a retired Bulgarian football midfielder.

References

1946 births
Living people
Bulgarian footballers
PFC Slavia Sofia players
Bulgaria international footballers
Association football midfielders